This is a list of notable events relating to the environment in 1991. They relate to environmental law, conservation, environmentalism and environmental issues.

Events
The New Zealand Forest Accord between forestry associations and environmental groups is signed.
The Rotvoll controversy arose in Norway concerning the construction of a research and development facility for Statoil. It was a political controversy with concerns over secrecy and the lack of legally required environmental impact studies.

January
The Gulf War oil spill began. It is one of the largest oil spills in history and resulted from the Gulf War in 1991 causing considerable damage to wildlife in the Persian Gulf, especially in areas surrounding Kuwait and Iraq.
The Kuwaiti oil fires began and were caused by Iraqi military forces setting fire to more than 600 oil wells as part of a scorched earth policy while retreating from Kuwait.

February
The Protocol to the 1979 Convention on Long-Range Transboundary Air Pollution Concerning the Control of Emissions of Nitrogen Oxides or Their Transboundary Fluxes (Nitrogen Oxide Protocol) came into force.

March
The Air Quality Agreement, an environmental treaty between Canada and the United States, was signed by Canadian Prime Minister Brian Mulroney and American President George H. W. Bush. It entered into force immediately.

July
The Resource Management Act 1991 (RMA) passed into law in New Zealand. It is a significant, and at times, controversial Act of Parliament. The RMA promotes the sustainable management of natural and physical resources such as land, air and water.

October
The Agreement on the Conservation of Seals in the Wadden Sea enters into force.

See also

Human impact on the environment
List of environmental issues